Ann Davison may refer to:
 Ann Davison (sailor)
 Ann Davison (politician)

See also
 Anne Davidson, Scottish sculptor and artist